The 2014 Albanian demonstrations in the Republic of Macedonia were series of protests in cities populated with Albanians in the Republic of Macedonia, following the sentence to life imprisonment of six ethnic Albanians, related to Smilkovci lake killings and the Operation "Monster".

Background

Protests
The first protest took place on 4 July in Čairčanka area of Skopje, after the Jum'ah prayer. There were about 9,000 peoples involved in the protest and several participants and police were injured. On 5 July, protest took place the afternoon of in the Čair and the Čairčanka areas of Skopje Demonstrations that took place on 6 July were in the following cities: Skopje, Debar, Gostivar, Kičevo, Kumanovo, Ohrid, Struga, and Tetovo. On 11 July, the protesters were gathered at the Jaja Pasha Mosque in Skopje, after the Friday prayer and continued towards the Courthouse. There were more than 10,000 protesters gathered in this day.

See also
 2013 Albanian demonstrations in Macedonia

References 

Modern history of North Macedonia
2014 protests
2014 in the Republic of Macedonia